The 2019 Northern NSW Football season was the sixth season under the new competition format in northern New South Wales.

League Tables

2019 National Premier League Northern NSW

At the end of the season, the Newcastle Jets Youth team transferred to the National Premier Leagues NSW, within the newly created NPL4 Division. They were subsequently promoted to the NPL2 Division mid-season, when the 2020 season resumed in July.

Finals

Cup Competitions

FFA Cup Preliminary rounds

Northern NSW soccer clubs competed in 2019 within the Northern NSW Preliminary rounds for the 2019 FFA Cup. In addition to the A-League club Newcastle Jets, the two Round 7 winners - Edgeworth FC and Maitland FC - qualified for the final rounds of the FFA Cup, entering at the Round of 32. Edgeworth FC reached the Round of 16.

References

2019 in Australian soccer